Gabriola minor is a species of geometrid moth in the family Geometridae. It is found in North America.

The MONA or Hodges number for Gabriola minor is 6784.

References

Further reading

 

Nacophorini
Articles created by Qbugbot
Moths described in 1974